The 1996 Whitehorse West territorial by-election took place on February 5, 1996. The by-election was triggered by the resignation of the district's incumbent MLA Tony Penikett on September 27, 1995.

NDP candidate David Sloan won the by-election.

Background 
The previous MLA for Whitehorse West, Tony Penikett, resigned on September 27, 1995 to accept a position as a policy advisor in the office of Saskatchewan Premier Roy Romanow.

Results 

| NDP
| Dave Sloan
| align="right"| 433
| align="right"| 42.3%
| align="right"| -3.3%

 
|Liberal
| Larry Bagnell
| align="right"| 326
| align="right"| 31.9%
| align="right"| +14.8%

|- bgcolor="white"
!align="left" colspan=3|Total
! align=right| 1023
! align=right| 100.0%
! align=right| –

References 

1996 elections in Canada
1996 in Yukon
Territorial by-elections in Yukon